Kuzyanovo (Köźän) is a rural locality (a selo) and the administrative centre of Kuzyanovsky Selsoviet, Ishimbaysky District, Bashkortostan, Russia. The population was 847 as of 2010. There are 10 streets.

Geography 
Kuzyanovo is located 43 km northeast of Ishimbay (the district's administrative centre) by road. Pavlovka is the nearest rural locality.

References 

Rural localities in Ishimbaysky District
Sterlitamaksky Uyezd